Escuela Nacional de Bellas Artes may refer to:

 Academy of San Carlos, formerly known as the Escuela Nacional de Bellas Artes, Mexico City
 Escuela Nacional de Bellas Artes (Honduras), in Comayagüela
 Escuela Nacional de Bellas Artes (Nicaragua) in Managua
 Escuela Nacional de Bellas Artes "San Alejandro" in Marianao, Havana
 Escuela Nacional Superior Autónoma de Bellas Artes, in Lima, Peru
 Faculty of Arts and Design, of the Universidad Nacional Autónoma de México, in Xochimilco, Mexico City

See also
 Escuela de Bellas Artes (disambiguation)